Young Poland was a modernist period in Polish visual arts, literature and music, covering roughly the years between 1890 and 1918. It was a result of strong aesthetic opposition to the earlier ideas of Positivism. Young Poland promoted trends of decadence, neo-romanticism, symbolism, impressionism and art nouveau.

Many of the exhibitions were held at the Palace of Art, also known as "Secession" (Secesja), the headquarters of the Kraków Society of Friends of Fine Arts, in Kraków Old Town.

Philosophy 

The term was coined in a manifesto by writer , published in 1898 in the Kraków newspaper Życie (Life), and was soon adopted in all of partitioned Poland by analogy to similar terms such as Young Germany, Young Belgium, Young Scandinavia, etc.

Literature 

Polish literature of the period was based on two main concepts. The earlier was a typically modernist disillusionment with the bourgeoisie, its life style and its culture. Artists following this concept also believed in decadence, an end of all culture, conflict between humans and their civilization, and the concept of art as the highest value (art for art's sake). Authors who followed this concept included Kazimierz Przerwa-Tetmajer, Stanisław Przybyszewski, Wacław Rolicz-Lieder and Jan Kasprowicz.

A later concept was a continuation of romanticism, and as such is often called neo-romanticism. The group of writers following this idea was less organised and the writers themselves covered a large variety of topics in their writings: from sense of mission of a Pole in Stefan Żeromski's prose, through social inequality described by Władysław Reymont and Gabriela Zapolska to criticism of Polish society and Polish history by Stanisław Wyspiański.

Writers of this period include also: Wacław Berent, Jan Kasprowicz, Jan Augustyn Kisielewski, Antoni Lange, Jan Lemański, Bolesław Leśmian, Tadeusz Miciński, Andrzej Niemojewski, Franciszek Nowicki, Władysław Orkan, Artur Oppman, Włodzimierz Perzyński, Tadeusz Rittner, Wacław Sieroszewski, Leopold Staff, Kazimierz Przerwa-Tetmajer, Maryla Wolska, Eleonora Kalkowska, Tadeusz Boy-Żeleński, and Jerzy Żuławski.

Music 
In music, the term Young Poland is applied to an informal group of composers that include Karol Szymanowski, Grzegorz Fitelberg, Ludomir Różycki as well as Mieczysław Karłowicz and Apolinary Szeluto. Almost all educated by Zygmunt Noskowski, the group was under strong influence of neoromanticism in music and especially of foreign composers such as Richard Strauss, Richard Wagner and those belonging to The Mighty Handful group e.g. Modest Mussorgsky, Alexander Borodin and Nikolai Rimsky-Korsakov.

Visual arts 

In the period of Young Poland there were no overwhelming trends in Polish art. The painters and sculptors tried to continue the romantic traditions with new ways of expression popularised abroad. The most influential trend was art nouveau, although Polish artists started to seek also some form of a national style (including styl zakopiański or the Zakopane style). Both sculpture and painting were also heavily influenced by all forms of symbolism.

Prominent Young Poland painters and sculptors include:

 Ferdynand Ruszczyc
 Jacek Malczewski
 Jan Bukowski
 Jan Raszka
 Jan Stanisławski
 Jan Talaga
 Julian Fałat
 Józef Mehoffer
 Józef Pankiewicz
 Karol Frycz
 Kazimierz Sichulski
 Konstanty Brandel
 Konstanty Laszczka
 Leon Wyczółkowski
 Ludwik Konarzewski
 Maurycy Lilien
 Olga Boznańska
 Stanisław Wyspiański
 Teodor Axentowicz
 Teofil Terlecki
 Wacław Szymanowski
 Witold Wojtkiewicz
 Wojciech Gerson
 Wojciech Kossak
 Wojciech Weiss
 Władysław Ślewiński
 Włodzimierz Przerwa-Tetmajer
 Xawery Dunikowski

See also
 History of Poland (1795–1918)

Notes and references 

Stanisław Wyspiański, biography from the Adam Mickiewicz Institute 
First review of Wesele (The Wedding Reception)
 Wyspiański’s Herbal
Wyspiański’s paintings
Wyspiański stained-glasses
 Kultura polska - Konstanty Laszczka

Bibliography 
Dobrowolski Tadeusz, Sztuka Młodej Polski, Warszawa 1963.
Słownik artystów polskich i obcych w Polsce działających. Malarze, rzeźbiarze, graficy, t. II, Wrocław 1975 (Urszula Leszczyńska).
Puciata-Pawłowska Joanna, Konstanty Laszczka, Siedlce 1980.

External links 

1890s in Poland
1900s in Poland
1910s in Poland
Cultural history of Poland
Modern art
Art Nouveau
Decadent literature
Impressionism
Neo-romanticism
Symbolism (arts)
19th-century Polish literature
20th-century Polish literature